The 1882 Texas gubernatorial election was held to elect the Governor of Texas. John Ireland was elected over U.S. Representative George Washington "Wash" Jones, an independent with Republican and Greenback support.

Ireland was the third consecutive Governor to have been elected from the Texas Supreme Court.

General election

Candidates
John Ireland, Associate Justice of the Texas Supreme Court (Democratic)
George Washington Jones, U.S. Representative from Bastrop (Independent)

Results

References

1882
Texas
1882 Texas elections